The Holmdel Township Public Schools is a comprehensive community public school district that serves students in pre-kindergarten through twelfth grade from Holmdel Township, in Monmouth County, New Jersey, United States.

As of the 2018–19 school year, the district, comprised of four schools, had an enrollment of 2,997 students and 263.6 classroom teachers (on an FTE basis), for a student–teacher ratio of 11.4:1.

The district is classified by the New Jersey Department of Education as being in District Factor Group "I", the second-highest of eight groupings. District Factor Groups organize districts statewide to allow comparison by common socioeconomic characteristics of the local districts. From lowest socioeconomic status to highest, the categories are A, B, CD, DE, FG, GH, I and J.

History
Until 1962, the district had sent students in grades nine to twelve to Keyport High School as part of a  sending/receiving relationship. The district started sending students to Red Bank High School in 1962, which ended when the district opened Holmdel High School in September 1973.

Schools
Schools in the district (with 2018–19 enrollment data from the National Center for Education Statistics) are:

Elementary schools
Village Elementary School with 759 students in grades PreK-3
Arthur Howard, Principal
Indian Hill School with 752 students in grades 4-6
Lisa Vitale, Principal
Middle school
William R. Satz School with 521 students in grades 7-8
William Loughran, Principal
High school
Holmdel High School with 962 students in grades 9-12
Dr. Matthew Kukoda, Principal

Administration
Core members of the district's administration are:
Scott Cascone, Superintendent
Michael Petrizzo, Business Administrator / Board Secretary

Board of education
The district's board of education, comprised of nine members, sets policy and oversees the fiscal and educational operation of the district through its administration. As a Type II school district, the board's trustees are elected directly by voters to serve three-year terms of office on a staggered basis, with three seats up for election each year held (since 2012) as part of the November general election. The board appoints a superintendent to oversee the district's day-to-day operations and a business administrator to supervise the business functions of the district.

References

External links
Holmdel Township Public Schools

School Data for the Holmdel Township Public Schools, National Center for Education Statistics

Holmdel Township, New Jersey
New Jersey District Factor Group I
School districts in Monmouth County, New Jersey